The mandarin duck (Aix galericulata) is a perching duck species native to the East Palearctic. Outside of its native range, the mandarin duck has a large introduced population in the British Isles and Western Europe, with additional smaller introductions in North America.

Description
The adult male has a red bill, large white crescent above the eye and reddish face and "whiskers". The male's breast is purple with two vertical white bars, the flanks ruddy, and he has two orange feathers at the back (large feathers that stick up similar to boat sails). The female is similar to the female wood duck, with a white eye-ring and stripe running back from the eye, but is paler below, has a small white flank stripe, and a pale tip to its bill. 

Both the males and females have crests, but the purple crest is more pronounced on the male.

Like many other species of ducks, the male undergoes a moult after the mating season into eclipse plumage. When in eclipse plumage, the male looks similar to the female, but can be told apart by its bright yellow-orange or red beak, lack of any crest, and a less-pronounced eye-stripe.

Mandarin ducklings are almost identical in appearance to wood ducklings, and very similar to mallard ducklings. The ducklings can be distinguished from mallard ducklings because the eye-stripe of mandarin ducklings (and wood ducklings) stops at the eye, while in mallard ducklings it reaches all the way to the bill.

Mutations
Various mutations of the mandarin duck are found in captivity. The most common is the white mandarin duck. Although the origin of this mutation is unknown, the constant pairing of related birds and selective breeding is presumed to have led to recessive gene combinations, leading in turn to genetic conditions including leucism.

Distribution and habitat
The species was once widespread in East Asia, but large-scale exports and the destruction of its forest habitat have reduced populations in eastern Russia and in China to below 1,000 pairs in each country; Japan, however, is thought to still hold some 5,000 pairs. The Asian populations are migratory, overwintering in lowland eastern China and southern Japan.

Specimens frequently escape from collections, and in the 20th century, a large, feral population was established in Great Britain; more recently, small numbers have bred in Ireland, concentrated in the parks of Dublin. Now, about 7,000 are in Britain with other populations on the European continent, the largest of which is in the region of Berlin. Isolated populations exist in the United States. The town of Black Mountain, North Carolina, has a limited population, and a free-flying feral population of several hundred mandarins exist in Sonoma County, California. This population is the result of several ducks escaping from captivity, then reproducing in the wild. In 2018, a single bird, dubbed Mandarin Patinkin, was seen in New York City's Central Park.

The habitats it prefers in its breeding range are the dense, shrubby forested edges of rivers and lakes. In winter, it additionally occurs in marshes, flooded fields, and open rivers. While it prefers fresh water, it may also be seen wintering in coastal lagoons and estuaries. In its introduced European range, it lives in more open habitat than in its native range, around the edges of lakes, water meadows, and cultivated areas with woods nearby.

Behaviour
Compared to other ducks, mandarins are shy birds, preferring to seek cover under trees such as overhanging willows, and form smaller flocks, but may become bolder as a result of becoming tame from frequent interaction with humans.

Breeding

In the wild, mandarin ducks breed in densely wooded areas near shallow lakes, marshes or ponds. They nest in cavities in trees close to water and during the spring. A single clutch of nine to twelve eggs is laid in April or May. Although the male may defend the brooding female and his eggs during incubation, he himself does not incubate the eggs and leaves before they hatch. Shortly after the ducklings hatch, their mother flies to the ground and coaxes the ducklings to leap from the nest. After all of the ducklings are out of the tree, they will follow their mother to a nearby body of water.

Food and feeding

Mandarins feed by dabbling or walking on land. They mainly eat plants and seeds, especially beech mast. The species will also add snails, insects and small fish to its diet. The diet of mandarin ducks changes seasonally; in the fall and winter, they mostly eat acorns and grains. In the spring, they mostly eat insects, snails, fish and aquatic plants. In the summer, they eat dew worms, small fish, frogs, mollusks, and small snakes. They feed mainly near dawn or dusk, perching in trees or on the ground during the day.

Threats
Predation of the mandarin duck varies between different parts of its range. Mink, raccoon dogs, otters, polecats, Eurasian eagle-owls, and grass snakes are all predators of the mandarin duck. The greatest threat to the mandarin duck is habitat loss due to loggers. Hunters are also a threat to the mandarin duck, because often they are unable to recognize the mandarin in flight and as a result, many are shot by accident. Mandarin ducks are not hunted for food, but are still poached because their extreme beauty is prized.

In culture

Chinese culture

In traditional Chinese culture, mandarin ducks are believed to be lifelong couples, unlike other species of ducks. Hence they are regarded as a symbol of conjugal affection and fidelity, and are frequently featured in Chinese art.

A Chinese proverb for loving couples uses the mandarin duck as a metaphor: "Two mandarin ducks playing in water". A mandarin duck symbol is also used in Chinese weddings because in traditional Chinese lore, they symbolize wedded bliss and fidelity. Because the male and female plumages of the mandarin duck are so unalike,  is frequently used colloquially in Cantonese to mean an "odd couple" or "unlikely pair" – a mixture of two different types of same category. For example, the drink  and  fried rice. Mandarin ducks featured on the flag of Weihaiwei during British rule.

Korean culture

For Koreans, mandarin ducks represent peace, fidelity, and plentiful offspring. Similar to the Chinese, they believe that these ducks mate for life. For these reasons, pairs of wooden-carved mandarin ducks called wedding ducks are often given as wedding gifts and play a significant role in Korean marriage.

Japanese culture
Similarly, in Japanese the ducks are called  and are used in the phrase . In addition, the Crown Prince wear the Sokutai decorated with a pattern features oshidori.

Gallery

References

Further reading

External links

 RSPB Birds by Name — Mandarin Duck
 Mandarin Duck Research Pages - Birkbeck, University of London
 Mandarin Duck Research
 

mandarin duck
Articles containing video clips
mandarin duck
Birds of Manchuria
Birds of Japan
Birds of Taiwan
mandarin duck
mandarin duck